This is a list of Royal Navy ship names starting with B.

B

 
 
 
 
 
 
 
 
 
 
 
 
 
 
 
 
 
 
 
 
 
 Bahama
 
 Bala
 
 
 
 
 
 Ballarat
 
  
 Balsam
 Baltic
 
 
 
 
 
 
 
 
 
 
 
 
 Bantum
 
 
 
 

 
 Barbette
 
 
 
 
 Bark of Bullen
 Bark of Murlesse
 Barle
 Barlight
  
 
  
 
 
  
 
 
 Basing
 
 Bastion
 
 Batavia
 
 Bathgate
 Bathurst
 Batman
 
 
 
 
 
 
 
 
 
 
 
 Beagle
 Bear
 
 
 
 
 
 Beauly Firth
 Beaumaris
 Beaumont
 
 
 Beccles
 
 Beckwith
 
 
 
 
 
 
 Beehive
 
  
 
 
 Belem
 
 Belfast
 
 Belle Isle
 
 
 
 
 Bellisarius
 
 
 
 
 
 
 Belzebub
 Ben Lomond
 Ben Meidie
 Ben Nevis
 
 Bend Or
  
 Bengal 
 
 Benjamin & Ann
 
 
 
 Berberis
 
  
 
 
 Bergere
 
 
 
 
 
 
 
 Beschermer
 
 Betty
 
 Bevington
 Bezan
 Bhamo
 
 
 
 Bickington
 
 
 Bienfaisant
 
 
 Bildeston
 Bilsthorpe
 
 
 
 
 
 
 
 
 

 Black Bear
 Black Bull
 Black Dog
 

 

 Black Posthorse
 
 Black Spread-Eagle
 
 
 
 
 
 Blackmore Ketch
 Blackmore Lady
 
 
 
 
 
 
 
 Blakeney
 
 Blandford
 
 
 
 
 
 
 
 
 
 Blessing
 Blickling
 
 
 
 Bloom
 
 
 
 
 
 
 
 
 
 
 
 
 
 
 Boomerang
 
 Bonavoila
 
 Bonita
 Bonito
 
 
 
 
 
 
 
 
 
 
 
 Boscawen II
 Boscawen III
 Bossington
 
 
 
 
 
 Boulogne
 Boulston
 
 
 
 Bourbonnaise
 Bourdelais
 
 
 
 
 Braave
 
 Bradford
 
 
 
 Brakel
  
 
 
 Branlebas
 
 
 
 
 
 
 
 
 
 
 
 
 
 
 
 Brevdrageren
 Briar
 
  
 
 
 
 Brigandine
 Brigantine
 
 
 
 
 
 Brilliant Prize
 
 
 
 
 
 
 
 
 
 
 Brixham
 Broederschap
 
 
 
 
 Brock
 
 
 Brolga
 
 Broom
 Broome
 
 Brothers
  
 
 
 
 
 
 
 
 
 
 
 Buck
 Buckie
 
 
  
 Bude
 
 
 Bull
 Bull dog
 
 
 
 Bullfrog
 Bullhead
  
 
 Bulrush
 
 Burchett
 Burdock
 
 
 
 Burgonet
 
 
 Burnaston
 
 
  
 
 
 
 
 Buss
 
 Bustler
 Busy
 
 Butterfly
 Buttington
 Buttress

See also
 List of aircraft carriers of the Royal Navy
 List of amphibious warfare ships of the Royal Navy
 List of pre-dreadnought battleships of the Royal Navy
 List of dreadnought battleships of the Royal Navy
 List of battlecruisers of the Royal Navy
 List of cruisers of the Royal Navy
 List of destroyers of the Royal Navy
 List of fast patrol boats of the Royal Navy
 List of frigates of the Royal Navy
 List of monitors of the Royal Navy
 List of mine countermeasure vessels of the Royal Navy (includes minesweepers and mine hunters)
 List of Royal Fleet Auxiliary ship names
 List of submarines of the Royal Navy
 List of survey vessels of the Royal Navy
 List of Royal Navy shore establishments

Notes

References
 

Names B
Royal Navy
 B
Royal Navy ships B